Mattheus is a masculine given name and surname, a Latin form of Matthew. Notable people with the name include:

Given name
 Mattheus van Beveren (c. 1630-1696), Flemish sculptor
 Mattheus Borrekens (1615-1670), Flemish engraver
 Mattheus Ignatius van Bree (1773-1839), Belgian painter
 Mattheus Pinna da Encarnaçao (1687-1764), Brazilian writer
 Mattheus de Haan (1663-1729), Dutch colonial governor
 Mattheus van Helmont (1623–c. 1685), Flemish painter
 Mattheus Lestevenon (1715–1797),  Dutch ambassador
 Mattheus Le Maistre (c. 1505-1577), Flemish choirmaster
 Mattheus Oliveira (born 1994), Brazilian footballer
 Mattheus Pronk (1947–2001), Dutch cyclist
 Mattheus Marinus Schepman (1847-1919), Dutch malacologist
 Mattheus Smallegange (1624-1710), Dutch historian
 Mattheus Terwesten (1670–1757), Dutch painter
 Mattheus Verheyden (1700–1776), Dutch painter
 Mattheus Wijtmans (17th century), Dutch painter

Middle name
 Joam Mattheus Adami (born 1576-1633), Italian Jesuit missionary
 Jacobus Mattheüs de Kempenaer (born 1793-1870), Dutch politician

Surname
 Charl Mattheus (born 1965), South African ultra marathon athlete
 Garrick Mattheus (born 1996), South African rugby union player
 Jan Mattheus (born 1965), Belgian cyclist
 Neels Mattheus (1935–2003), South African Afrikaner traditional musician
 Ryan Mattheus (born 1983), American baseball pitcher

See also
 Matheus
 Matteus (disambiguation)
 St Matthew Passion

Dutch masculine given names